S.P.I.T.: Squeegee Punks in Traffic is a Canadian 2001 documentary film by Daniel Cross.  The narrative unfolds from the point of view of squeegee kids.

The main character, "Roach," later on became an EyeSteelFilm documentary director as Eric "Roach" Denis.

External links 
 Spit Homepage.
 .

2001 films
EyeSteelFilm films
English-language Canadian films
Canadian documentary films
Documentary films about homelessness in Canada
2001 documentary films
Punk films
Films directed by Daniel Cross
2000s Canadian films